The BMW Sauber F1.06 (or simply BMW F1.06) was the car with which the BMW Sauber team competed in the 2006 Formula One World Championship. It was driven by German Nick Heidfeld, who joined from Williams, and Canadian Jacques Villeneuve, who had spent one season with Sauber before it was bought by BMW. However, Villeneuve was replaced by third driver, Pole Robert Kubica, before the season finished. The year marked the first time that BMW had competed as a full team; previously it had only supplied engines.

The chassis was designed by Willy Rampf, Jacky Eeckelaert and Seamus Mullarkey with the powertrain being designed by Heinz Paschen.

The 2006 season was treated as very much a transitional year by the team, so the car's level of competitiveness was a pleasant surprise. The F1.06 was a contender for points throughout the season, and its form culminated with two podium finishes: one for Heidfeld at the Hungaroring, and the other for Kubica at Monza.

BMW Sauber also developed the car throughout the year, with some sort of improvement available at every race. The team's innovation even caused controversy: a "flexible" rear wing was stiffened early in the season and two vertical pylons in front of the cockpit were banned after an appearance at Magny-Cours.

The team eventually finished fifth in the Constructors' Championship, with 36 points.

The F1.06 car is the last BMW Sauber car to be developed by Sauber due to team transition.

Livery
BMW Sauber went into the 2006 season with existing major sponsorship such as Credit Suisse, and Petronas. BMW Sauber received new sponsorship such as Intel and O2, a computer hardware company, DELL was started at 2006 European Grand Prix. The team's new livery, which was maintained throughout its tenure in Formula One, consisted of the traditional BMW blue and white with a hint of red. The front nose livery was also similar to BMW Williams 2001–2005 livery but the grey was replaced by red.

Gallery

Complete Formula One results
(key) (results in bold indicate pole position)

References

External links

BMW Sauber Formula One cars
Sauber F1.06
2006 Formula One season cars